El Llolly is a village east of the town of Paillaco, south-central Chile. The village is located in the Chilean Central Valley near Ranco Lake. It had 429 inhabitants as of 2017. The village lies next to Llollelhue River, with which it shares an etymology derived from the local word "llolle" meaning fish trap.

References

Populated places in Valdivia Province